The Webby Awards (colloquially referred to as the Webbys) are awards for excellence on the Internet presented annually by the International Academy of Digital Arts and Sciences, a judging body composed of over three thousand industry experts and technology innovators. Categories include websites, advertising and media, online film and video, mobile sites and apps, and social.

Two winners are selected in each category, one by members of The International Academy of Digital Arts and Sciences, and one by the public who cast their votes during Webby People's Voice voting. Each winner presents a five-word acceptance speech, a trademark of the annual awards show.

Hailed as the "Internet’s highest honor," the award is one of the oldest Internet-oriented awards, and is associated with the phrase "The Oscars of the Internet."

History 

In its early years, the organization was one among others vying to be the premiere internet awards show, most notably, the Cool Site of the Year Awards. Both shows would compare themselves to the Oscars, as did media outlets such as The New York Times to Canada's Globe & Mail.

The winners of the First Annual Webby Awards in 1995 were presented by John Brancato and Michael Ferris, writers for Columbia Pictures. It was held at the Hollywood Roosevelt Hotel. The televised Webby Awards were sponsored by the Academy of Web Design and Cool Site of the Day. The first Webby Awards were produced by Kay Dangaard at the Hollywood Roosevelt Hotel as a nod to the first site of the Academy of Motion Picture Arts and Sciences (Oscars). That first year, they were called "Webbie" Awards. The first "Site of the Year" winner was the pioneer webisodic serial The Spot.

The modern Webby Awards were co-founded by Tiffany Shlain, a filmmaker, when she was hired by The Web Magazine to re-establish them, and were first held in San Francisco in 1997. They quickly became known for its requirement that winners give their acceptance speeches in five words. After this, the awards became more successful than the magazine and IDG closed the publication. Shlain and co-founder Maya Draisin Farrah continued to run The Webby Awards until 2004.

The International Academy of Digital Arts and Sciences, which selects the winners of The Webby Awards, was established in 1998 by co-founders Tiffany Shlain, Spencer Ante and Maya Draisin. Members of the Academy include Kevin Spacey, Grimes, Questlove, Internet inventor Vint Cerf, Instagram’s Head of Fashion Partnerships Eva Chen, comedian Jimmy Kimmel, Twitter Founder Biz Stone, Vice Media Co-Founder and CEO Shane Smith, Tumblr’s David Karp, Director of Harvard's Berkman Klein Center for Internet & Society Susan P. Crawford, Refinery29’s Executive Creative Director Piera Gelardi, and CEO and cofounder of Gimlet Media Alex Blumberg.

The Webby Awards is owned and operated by the Webby Media Group, a division of Recognition Media, which also owns and produces the Lovie Awards in Europe and Netted by the Webbys, a daily email publication launched in 2009. David-Michel Davies, CEO of Webby Media Group, current Executive Director of the Webby Awards and co-founder of Internet Week New York, was named Executive Director of the Webby Awards in 2005.

In 2009, the 13th Annual Webby Awards received nearly 10,000 entries from all 50 states and over 60 countries. That same year, more than 500,000 votes were cast in The Webby People's Voice Awards. In 2012, the 16th Annual Webby awards received 1.5 million votes from more than 200 countries for the People's Voice awards. In 2015, the 19th Annual Webby Awards received nearly 13,000 entries from all 50 U.S. states and over 60 countries worldwide.

Nomination process 
The 2000 awards began the transition to nominee submissions. Previously, nominees had been selected by an internal committee.

During the Call for Entries phase, each entry is rated by Associate Members of the International Academy of Digital Arts & Sciences. Entries that receive the highest marks during this first round of voting are included on category-specific shortlists and further evaluated by Executive Members of the Academy.

Executive Academy Members with category-specific expertise evaluate the shortlisted entries based on the appropriate Website, Advertising & Media, Online Film & Video, Mobile Sites & Apps, and Social category criteria, and cast ballots to determine Webby Honorees, Nominees and Webby Winners. Deloitte provides vote tabulation consulting for the Webby Awards.

In addition to the award given in each category by the International Academy of Digital Arts and Sciences, another winner is selected in each category as determined by the general public during People's Voice voting. Winners of both the Academy-selected and People's Voice-selected awards are invited to the Webbys.

Awards granted 

The Webby Awards are presented in over a hundred categories among all four types of entries. A website can be entered in multiple categories and receive multiple awards.

In each category, two awards are handed out: a Webby Award selected by The International Academy of Digital Arts and Sciences, and a People's Voice Award selected by the  general public.

Past winners include Amazon.com, eBay, Travel + Leisure, Simply Hired, Kayak.com, Yahoo!, iTunes, Google, FedEx, BBC News, CNN, MSNBC, The New York Times, Annie Lennox, NPR, Salon Magazine, Facebook, Meetup, Wikipedia, Deleted - The Game, Flickr, ESPN, Comedy Central, PBS, The Office webisodes, SwiftKey, My Damn Channel, NASA, George Takei, People News Chronicle, Airbnb, The Onion, Kickstarter, Mashable, Zach Galifianakis, Justin Bieber, Rhett and Link, and Humans of New York.

Each year, the International Academy of Digital Arts and Sciences also honors individuals with Webby Special Achievement Awards. Past Webby Special Achievement winners include Stuart Webster, Al Gore, Prince, David Bowie, Meg Whitman, Tim & Eric, Sir Tim Berners-Lee, Lorne Michaels, Craig Newmark, Thomas Friedman, Stephen Colbert, Michel Gondry, the Beastie Boys, Kevin Spacey, Banksy, Lawrence Lessig, Van Jones, Gillian Anderson, Tituss Burgess, Ellie Kemper and Jerry Seinfeld.

Ceremony 
Between 2005 and 2019, the Webby Awards were presented in New York City. Comedian Rob Corddry hosted the ceremony from 2005 to 2007. Seth Meyers of Saturday Night Live hosted in 2008 and 2009, B.J. Novak of NBC's The Office in 2010, and Lisa Kudrow in 2011. Comedian, actor, and writer Patton Oswalt hosted from 2012 to 2014. Comedian Hannibal Buress hosted in 2015.

The Webbys are famous for limiting recipients to five-word speeches, which are often humorous, although some exceed the limit. In 2005 when accepting his Lifetime Achievement Award, former Vice President Al Gore's speech was "Please don't recount this vote." He was introduced by Vint Cerf who used the same format to state, "We all invented the Internet." In 2008, Stephen Colbert shouted “Me. Me. Me. Me. Me” when accepting his award for Webby Person of the Year. Accepting the award for Best Political Blog in 2008, Arianna Huffington’s speech was “President Obama ... Sounds good, right?"

Other popular speeches include "Can anyone fix my computer?" (the Beastie Boys); "Everything you think is true" (Prince); "Thank God Conan got promoted" (Jimmy Fallon), "Free, open... Keep one Web" (Sir Tim Berners Lee), “Holy - Fucking - Shit, Buzz Aldrin" (Jake Hurwitz), "A E I O U" (Björk), and "Holocaust. Did it happen? Yes." (Sarah Silverman).

In 2013, the creator of the Graphics Interchange Format (GIF), Steve Wilhite, accepted his Webby and delivered his now famous five-word speech, "It’s pronounced 'Jif' not 'Gif'."

Criticism 

The Webbys have been criticized for their pay-to-enter and pay-to-attend policy (winners and nominees also have to pay to attend the award ceremony), and thus for not taking most websites into consideration before distributing their awards.  Gawker, its Valleywag column, and others, have called the awards a scam, with Valleywag saying, "...somewhere along the way, the organizers figured out that this goofy charade could be milked for profit."

In response, Webby Awards executive director David-Michel Davies told the Wall Street Journal that entry fees “provide the best and most sustainable model for ensuring that our judging process remains consistent and rigorous and is not dependent on things like sponsorships that can fluctuate from year to year.”

See also 

 Shorty Awards
 Streamy Awards
 List of web awards

References

Further reading 
 Joanna Glasner, "Usual Suspects Dominate Webbys" - Wired News, May 9, 2006
 Jack Shafer,  "What? You've Not Been Honored by the Webbys?", Slate Magazine, April 9, 2008

External links 
 
 Webby Awards at YouTube

Computer-related awards
American science and technology awards
Web awards
Blog awards
Web development
Internet film festivals
Awards established in 1996
 
Podcasting awards
Television series by Boardwalk Pictures